Muie is a remote village, situated in eastern Sutherland, Scottish Highlands and is in the Scottish council area of Highland.'''

The village of Ardachu lies less than 0.5 miles to the south with the village of Lairg lying 5 miles west along the main A839 road, with the villages of Pittentrail and Morvich lying east along the A839.

Populated places in Sutherland